Hollywood Barn Dance is a 1947 American film starring Ernest Tubb. It was based on the CBS radio program of the same name, which was originally hosted by Cottonseed Clark, which, in turn, was a "replacement" for Gene Autry's Melody Ranch radio show, aired while the famed singing cowboy was serving in the Army Air Force during World War II.

Jack Schwarz bought the film rights in 1947.

Plot

Cast
Ernest Tubb as himself
Lori Talbott as Helen
The Texas Troubadours
Helen Boyce

References

External links

1947 films
American musical films
Films directed by Bernard B. Ray
Lippert Pictures films
1947 musical films
American black-and-white films
1940s English-language films
1940s American films